Mnestheus is a genus of skippers in the family Hesperiidae.

Species
The following species are recognised in the genus Mnestheus:
 Mnestheus damma (Evans, 1955)
 Mnestheus ittona (Butler, 1870)
 Mnestheus servilius (Möschler, 1882)

References

Natural History Museum Lepidoptera genus database

Hesperiinae
Hesperiidae genera